Moonlight and Cactus is a 1932 comedy film directed by Fatty Arbuckle.

Cast
 Tom Patricola
 Charles Judels
 Charles Dorety
 Louise Lorraine
 Rene Borden

See also
 Fatty Arbuckle filmography

External links

1932 films
1932 comedy films
1932 short films
Films directed by Roscoe Arbuckle
Educational Pictures short films
American black-and-white films
American comedy short films
Films with screenplays by Jack Townley
1930s English-language films
1930s American films